Brendan McCarthy (born 5 April 1947) is an Irish boxer. He competed in the men's flyweight event at the 1968 Summer Olympics. At the 1968 Summer Olympics, he lost to Ricardo Delgado of Mexico by decision in the Round of 16 after receiving a bye in the Round of 32.

References

External links
 

1947 births
Living people
Flyweight boxers
Irish male boxers
Olympic boxers of Ireland
Boxers at the 1968 Summer Olympics
Sportspeople from Dublin (city)